The Kishapu Solar Power Station is a proposed  solar power plant in Tanzania. The power station is under development by Tanzania Electric Supply Company Limited (TANESCO), the national electricity monopoly utility company. The energy will be integrated into the national grid, also operated by TANESCO. The solar farm will be developed in phases to capacity of 150 megawatts. When completed and commissioned, it will be the largest, grid-ready solar power station in the country.

Location
The power station would be located in the Kishapu District, in the Shinyanga Region of Tanzania. The solar farm is bordered on one side by the 220 kV Singida–Shinyanga High Voltage Power Line.

Overview
The power station, which will be developed in phases, has a maximum generation capacity of the first phase of 50 megawatts.
The solar farm helps Tanzania diversify its electricity generation mix with clean carbon dioxide-free energy. Another objective is the modernization of the TANESCO grid. A new "National Grid Control Center" will be established in Dodoma. A "Distribution Control Center with a Distribution Management System" will also be installed in key urban locations, including Arusha, Dodoma, Mbeya and Mwanza. The energy generated a this power station is expected to "stabilize the grid and reduce technical losses".

Funding and timeline
The French Development Agency (AFD) lent €130 million for the solar power station. AFD also granted an extra €700,000 for grid modernization and technical loss reduction. Construction of the first phase of Kishapu Solar Power Plant is expected to start in March 2022 and conclude approximately one year later. Phase II will follow after that.

See also

 List of power stations in Tanzania

References

External links
 Tanesco Webpage.

Solar power stations in Tanzania
Shinyanga Region
Proposed solar power stations